Roy Park may refer to:

Roy H. Park (1910–1993), American media executive
Roy Park (sportsman) (1892–1947), Australian cricketer and Australian rules footballer